An "all persons fictitious" disclaimer in a work of media states that the persons portrayed in it are not based on real people. This is done mostly on realistic films and television programs to reduce the possibility of legal action for libel from any person who believes that they have been defamed by their portrayal in the work, whether portrayed under their real name or a different name. The wording of this disclaimer varies, and differs from jurisdiction to jurisdiction, as does its legal effectiveness.

The disclaimer for American studio films and television series is routinely included among disclaimers on other topics, such as copyright, animal welfare, adult content and promotion of tobacco use, such as:
 This motion picture is protected under the copyright laws of the United States and other countries throughout the world. Country of first publication: United States of America. Any unauthorized exhibition, distribution, or copying of this film or any part thereof (including soundtrack) may result in civil liability and criminal prosecution.
 The story, all names, characters, and incidents portrayed in this production are fictitious. No identification with actual persons (living or deceased), places, buildings, and products is intended or should be inferred.
 No person or entity associated with this film received payment or anything of value, or entered into any agreement, in connection with the depiction of tobacco products.
 No animals were harmed in the making of this motion picture.

Origins
The disclaimer came as a result of litigation against the 1932 Metro-Goldwyn-Mayer (MGM) film Rasputin and the Empress, which insinuated that the character Princess Natasha had been raped by Russian mystic Rasputin. The character of Natasha was supposedly intended to represent Princess Irina Alexandrovna of Russia, who sued MGM for libel. After seeing the film twice, the jury agreed that the princess had been defamed. Irina and her husband Felix Yusupov were reportedly awarded $127,373 in damages by the English Court of Appeal in 1934, and $1,000,000 in an out-of-court settlement with MGM. As a preventive measure against further lawsuits, the film was taken out of distribution for decades.

The film began with a claim that "This concerns the destruction of an empire … A few of the characters are still alive—the rest met death by violence." Reportedly, a judge in the case told MGM that not only was this claim damaging to their case, but that their case would be stronger if they had incorporated a directly opposite statement, that the film was not intended as an accurate portrayal of real people or events. Prompted by the outcome of this case, many studios began to incorporate an "all persons fictitious" disclaimer in their films, to protect themselves from similar court action.

Later uses

Although the disclaimer is routinely included as boilerplate, producers sometimes vary from it, sometimes to make a statement about the veracity of their work, for humor, or to satirize the standard disclaimer.

The disclaimer is sometimes presented with qualifications.

 In Jack Webb's police series Dragnet, each episode begins with an announcer intoning, "The story you are about to see is true. The names have been changed to protect the innocent." In parody, the Square One Television "Mathnet" segments (an affectionate send-up of Dragnet) began each episode with "The story you are about to see is a fib, but it's short. The names are made up, but the problems are real."
 The 1969 Western film Butch Cassidy and the Sundance Kid, based upon real individuals whose lives and exploits already had a place among American legends of the West, opens with the disclaimer "Most of what follows is true."
 Because of the autobiographical nature of Dave Eggers' memoir, A Heartbreaking Work of Staggering Genius, the book features the following play on the usual disclaimer: "Any resemblance to persons living or dead should be plainly apparent to them and those who know them, especially if the author has been kind enough to have provided their real names and, in some cases, their phone numbers. All events described herein actually happened, though on occasion the author has taken certain, very small, liberties with chronology, because that is his right as an American."
 South Park, which frequently features well-known public figures or parodies of them, always opens with a tongue-in-cheek disclaimer that begins by stating, "All characters and events in this show—even those based on real people—are entirely fictional. All celebrity voices are impersonated... poorly. The following program contains coarse language and due to its content it should not be viewed by anyone."
 The Adult Swim stop-motion animation series Robot Chicken begins each episode with the disclaimer "Any actual names or likenesses of celebrities are used in a fictitious and parodic manner."

Disclaimers can occasionally be used to make political or similar points. One such disclaimer is shown at the end of the industrial/political thriller The Constant Gardener, signed by the author of the original book, John le Carré: "Nobody in this story, and no outfit or corporation, thank God, is based upon an actual person or outfit in the real world. But I can tell you this; as my journey through the pharmaceutical jungle progressed, I came to realize that, by comparison with the reality, my story was as tame as a holiday postcard." Other examples of such variation include:
 The 1941 film Hellzapoppin' displays a comic variant of the disclaimer during the opening titles: "...any similarity between HELLZAPOPPIN''' and a motion picture is purely coincidental."
 The 1943 film I Walked with a Zombie displays the following disclaimer during its opening titles: "Any similarity to any persons, living, dead, OR POSSESSED, is entirely coincidental."
 The 1969 film Z, which is based on the military dictatorship ruling Greece at that time, has this notice: "Any resemblance to actual events, to persons living or dead, is not the result of chance. It is DELIBERATE."
 German nobel laureate Heinrich Böll's novel The Lost Honour of Katharina Blum was originally preceded by a statement which made the usual disclaimer, but stated that similarities to the journalistic practices of the German newspaper Bild "are neither intended nor coincidental but inevitable"; this disclaimer was later removed in the English edition.

The familiar disclaimer is often rewritten for humor. Early examples include The Three Stooges' parody of Nazi Germany You Nazty Spy, which stated that "Any resemblance between the characters in this picture and any persons, living or dead, is a miracle," and its sequel I'll Never Heil Again, which features a disclaimer that states that "The characters in this picture are fictitious. Anyone resembling them is better off dead." Other examples include:
 In the 1966 film Thunderbirds Are Go, set in the year 2068, a disclaimer states: "None of the characters appearing in this photoplay intentionally resemble any persons living or dead… SINCE THEY DO NOT YET EXIST".
 In the 1981 film An American Werewolf in London, and in the 1983 music video Michael Jackson's Thriller, the disclaimer refers to "persons living, dead or undead".
 Debbie Does Dallas, a 1978 pornographic film, does not use the disclaimer in print, but Bambi Woods, in the film's trailer, insists the film is "completely fictional" while at the same time surmising that the events in the film "could have really happened."

Variations sometimes employ irony or satire. The 1985 film The Return of the Living Dead features a disclaimer that reads "The events portrayed in this film are all true. The names are real names of real people and real organizations." The novel Breakfast of Champions by Kurt Vonnegut features a truncated version of the disclaimer: "All persons, living and dead, are purely coincidental, and should not be construed", referring to the novel's existentialist themes. The 1990 film Slacker ends with "This story was based on fact. Any similarity with fictitious events or characters was purely coincidental."

In response to controversies over cultural appropriation and the use of an indigenous term, Filipino television network ABS-CBN used a special disclaimer in the 2018 fantaserye Bagani, maintaining that the series takes place in an alternate fantasy universe inspired by, but unrelated to, pre-colonial Philippines and is in no way intended to trivialize or misrepresent tribal groups: "Ang kuwentong inyong mapapanood ay kathang-isip lamang at kumuha ng inspirasyon mula sa iba’t ibang alamat at mitolohiyang Pilipino. Ito’y hindi tumutukoy o kumakatawan sa kahit anong Indigenous People sa Pilipinas." ("The story you are about to watch is a work of fiction and merely takes inspiration from various Philippine legends and mythologies. It does not pertain to nor does it represent any Indigenous People in the Philippines.")

Effectiveness
If a fictitious film is perceived to be too close to actual events, the disclaimer may be ruled null and void in court and the inspiration behind the film may be due compensation. Such was the case with the 1980 film The Idolmaker'', which was based on a fictional talent promoter who discovers a talentless teenage boy and turns him into a manufactured star. Singer Fabian, whose career path was very similar to the fictional boy's, took offense at the caricature, and the production company responded with the all persons fictitious disclaimer. As the promoter on which the fictional character was based, Bob Marcucci, was part of the production staff (and thus it could not be plausibly denied that actual events inspired the film), Fabian ultimately received a settlement granting a minority stake in the film's profits.

See also
 Negative checking

References

Tort law
Film and video terminology